Depressaria genistella is a moth of the family Depressariidae. It is found in Spain.

The wingspan is about 22 mm. The forewings are pale mouse-grey and the hindwings are shining pale stone-grey.

The larvae feed on the flowers of Genista species, possibly Genista hispanica.

References

External links
lepiforum.de

Moths described in 1903
Depressaria
Moths of Europe